Final results for the water polo tournament at the 1932 Summer Olympics:

Medal summary

Results

6 August

7 August

8 August

9 August

11 August

12 August

Annulled matches 

4 August

6 August

Final standings

Participating nations
Each country was allowed to enter a team of 11 players and all were eligible for participation.

A total of 41(*) water polo players from 5 nations competed at the Los Angeles Games:

 
 
 
 
 

(*) NOTE: There are only players counted, which participated in one game at least.

Not all reserve players are known.

Summary

References

Sources
 PDF documents in the LA84 Foundation Digital Library:
 Official Report of the 1932 Olympic Games (download, archive) (pp. 619–623, 646–652)
 Water polo on the Olympedia website
 Water polo at the 1932 Summer Olympics (men's tournament)
 Water polo on the Sports Reference website
 Water polo at the 1932 Summer Games (men's tournament) (archived)

 
1932 Summer Olympics events
1932
1932 in water polo
1932